Slobodni tjednik, also known as ST, is a defunct Croatian weekly magazine which was published in Zagreb in the early 1990s. Owned and edited by Marinko Božić, it was the first Croatian tabloid.

History
Slobodni tjednik ("Independent Weekly" in Croatian) appeared in February 1990, on the eve of first free elections in Croatia. While being one of many media outlets started in the final stages of Communism, Slobodni tjednik was the first to use sensationalist headlines and similar content, which wasn't available in mainstream media of the earlier times. As such, Slobodni tjednik quickly became one of the most popular, most influential but also one of the most controversial newspapers in Croatia.

Controversy was its editorial policy. While its first issue was very critical of Croatian Democratic Union (HDZ) and Croatian nationalism, in a matter of few weeks, Slobodni tjednik suddenly shifted towards the right, embracing Franjo Tuđman and his policies.

In 1992, with Croatia being internationally recognized and Sarajevo armistice bringing hostilities to temporary end, Croatian public gradually began to lose taste for extreme nationalism promoted by Slobodni tjednik. New media outlets, like Globus magazine, proved to be better adapted for new circumstances, while economic woes of its readership also affected circulation of Slobodni tjednik. That, financial mishandling, deteriorating health and death of its founder Marinko Božić on 16 December 1993 led to Slobodni tjednik being extinguished in 1993.

Sources

Smrtonosno novinarstvo
Lomača je postavljena, samo se hvataju vještice

Mogu li kriminalci, propali špijuni, ustašofili i loši tajkuni zauzeti hrvatske medije?

External links
ISTRAŽIVAČKO NOVINARSTVO, TABLOIDIZACIJA I ETIKA 

1990 establishments in Croatia
1993 disestablishments in Croatia
Defunct magazines published in Croatia
Defunct political magazines
Magazines established in 1990
Magazines disestablished in 1993
Mass media in Zagreb
Croatian-language magazines
Political magazines published in Croatia
Weekly magazines